A séance is an attempt to contact spirits.

Seance or seances may also refer to:
 Seance (band), a Swedish death metal band
Seance (album), by Australian rock band the Church
Séance (album), by Swedish black metal band Dark Fortress
Séance (2001 film), a Japanese horror film directed by Kiyoshi Kurosawa
 Derren Brown: Séance , a 2004  special by illusionist Derren Brown
 Séance (2006 film), an American horror film
 Seance (2021 film), an American-British horror film directed by Simon Barrett
Seances (film), lost Guy Maddin film project

See also 
 The Seance (disambiguation)